Stephen J. Morse is the Ferdinand Wakeman Hubbell Professor of Law at the University of Pennsylvania Law School. He also holds the position Professor of Psychology and Law in Psychiatry at University of Pennsylvania School of Medicine, and is the Associate Director of  Center for Neuroscience & Society at the University of Pennsylvania. He has written a number of papers on biological determinism, often emphasizing how difficult it would be for these ideas to be used as a criminal defense in a court of law.

Biography
He received an AB from Tufts in 1966, and then both a  JD and an EdM at Harvard University in 1970, followed by a PhD. also from Harvard, in 1973.

Sources 

Year of birth missing (living people)
Living people
Harvard Graduate School of Education alumni
Harvard Law School alumni
Tufts University alumni
University of Pennsylvania Law School faculty
Scholars of criminal law